A gubernatorial election was held on 16 December 2018 to elect the Governor of Saga Prefecture. Yoshinori Yamaguchi was re-elected.

Candidates
 Yoshinori Yamaguchi – incumbent Governor of Saga Prefecture, age 53

Results

References

Saga gubernatorial elections
2015 elections in Japan